Twilight of Idols was Fashion's 1984 album produced by Zeus B. Held and their only to feature singer/songwriter Alan Darby.

The track "Eye Talk" was released as a UK single, reaching No. 69 in February 1984 having been preceded in the charts by Fashion's earlier single releases: "Streetplayer (Mechanik)" and "Love Shadow".

The album was reissued on CD for the first time in March 2009 by Cherry Red Records, featuring 4 bonus tracks.

Track listing
 "Eye Talk" (Alan Thomas Darby) – 3:24
 "Dreaming" (Darby) – 4:12
 "Hit Girl" (Dik Davies, John Mulligan) – 3:49
 "Trader" (Darby, A. Robertson) – 4:29
 "You in the Night" (Darby, Francis McPadden) – 4:49
 "Delirious" (Marlon Recchi) – 3:36
 "Hurricane" (Darby) – 4:47
 "Too Much Too Soon" (Darby) – 3:41
 "Slow Down" (Darby) – 4:12
 "Twilight of Idols" (Darby) – 5:55
 "Eye Talk (Mutant Version)"* (Darby) – 9:17
 "Dreaming (Extended Version)"* (Darby) – 6:50
 "White Line Flyer (Extended Version)"* (Darby) – 3:20
 "You in the Night (Extended Version)"* (Darby, McPadden) – 5:22

Tracks marked with an asterisk (*) only appear on the CD reissue.

Personnel
Alan Darby - vocals, guitar
Mulligan - synthesizer, vocals
Marlon Recchi - bass guitar, vocals
Dik Davis - drums and percussion, vocals

1984 albums
Fashion (band) albums